Nagórki may refer to the following places:
Nagórki, Kuyavian-Pomeranian Voivodeship (north-central Poland)
Nagórki, Łódź Voivodeship (central Poland)
Nagórki, Podlaskie Voivodeship (north-east Poland)